Alessandro Panzeri, better known by his stage name Old Fashioned Lover Boy, is an Italian singer-songwriter. Since his debut in 2015 he has released two full-length studio albums, Our Life Will Be Made of Simple Things (2016) and Bright (2019), and shared stages with Paolo Nutini., Wild Nothing, Andy Shauf, Scott Matthew, Hurts and Micah P. Hinson.

Career

2015: The Iceberg Theory 
Living in Naples, he released two albums as a member of the Italian band Abulico. After moving to Milan, he begin recording as a solo artist, influenced by alt-folk artists such as Neil Halstead, Sigur Rós e Justin Vernon. On 3 March 2015 he released his debut EP "The Iceberg Theory" via Sangue Disken/Sherpa Records. The EP was received well by Italian critics, that defined it "a debut to remember". OFLB started his first 50 date live tour across Italy

2016 – 2017: Our Life Will Be Made of Simple Things 
In April 2016, Old Fashioned Lover Boy released a new single, titled "Oh My Love", produced, arranged and recorded by Marco Giudici (Any Other, Assyrians). The videoclip was inspired by the art of the French painter Fernand Léger. On 11 November 2016 he released the debut LP "Our Life Will Be Made of Simple Things". A few weeks earlier OFLB toured Japan in a minitour presented in the music video for single "Bowling Green". The album reached national and international exposure, received favorable response from Clash, Rockol and Rai Radio 1. Through 2016 and 2017 he racked up over 70 shows in Italy.

2019: Bright 
Anticipated by singles I Pray, Modern Life and Goodbye, on 11 November 2016 OFLB released his second album "Bright" via Flagless Records (Canadian release) and A Modest Proposal Records/Peermusic Italy (Italian release) and produced by Marco Giudici. With Bright his music took a shift from alt-folk to the softer sound of the piano with the addition of soul and R&B elements, influenced by artists such as Frank Ocean, Rex Orange County, James Blake, Style Council and Prefab Sprout. The album received positive feedback by Italian press, garnering a "Record of The Year" designation from Rumore and Indie-Roccia. It followed a European tour that saw him perform Italy, Germany, United Kingdom and Sweden.

2020–present 
In September 2020, Old Fashioned Lover Boy won the call made by SIAE and Italia Music Export, that rewarded the most interesting Italian music projects for export outside the country. On 11 December 2020 he released new single "50", that confirmed his shift to neo-soul and contemporary R&B sounds, influenced by artists such as Arlo Parks and Daniel Caesar.

Discography

Studio albums 
2016 – Our Life Will Be Made of Simple Things

2019 – Bright

Eps 
2015 – The Iceberg Theory

Singles 
2016 – Oh My Love

2016 – Bowling Green

2017 – So Far so CLose

2019 – I Pray

2019 – Modern Life

2019 – Goodbye

2020 – 50

References 

1984 births
Living people

21st-century Italian male musicians
21st-century Italian singers
Italian male singer-songwriters
Singers from Naples
Italian singer-songwriters